Nampo or Nanpo may refer to:

Korea
 Nampo, or Namp'o, a city in North Korea
 Nampo-dong, Chongjin, Songpyong-guyok, Chongjin, North Hamgyong Province, North Korea
 Nampo-dong, Busan, Jung District, Busan in South Korea
 Nampo Station (Busan)

Japan
A given name:
 Ōta Nampo or Ōta Nanpo
 Meaning south:
 Nanpō Islands south of Tokyo
 Southern Expeditionary Army Group (Nanpō gun)

See also
Nampo Station (disambiguation)
Nanpu (disambiguation)